Opéra-ballet (plural: opéras-ballets) is a genre of French Baroque lyric theatre that was most popular during the 18th century, combining elements of opera and ballet, "that grew out of the ballets à entrées of the early seventeenth century". It differed from the more elevated tragédie en musique as practised by Jean-Baptiste Lully in several ways. It contained more dance music than the tragédie, and the plots were not necessarily derived from classical mythology and allowed for the comic elements, which Lully had excluded from the tragédie en musique after Thésée (1675). The opéra-ballet consisted of a prologue followed by a number of self-contained acts (also known as entrées), often loosely grouped around a single theme. The individual acts could also be performed independently, in which case they were known as actes de ballet.

The first work in the genre is generally held to be André Campra's L'Europe galante ("Europe in Love") of 1697, but Les Saisons of 1695 is so typical of the genre that it is mentioned as the most distinctive prototype of this sort of composition, although the latter has a mythological plot. Famous later examples are Les élémens (1721) by Destouches,  Les Indes galantes (1735), and Les fêtes d'Hébé (1739) by Jean-Philippe Rameau.

Notes

References
 Anthony, James R. (2001). "Opéra-ballet" in The New Grove Dictionary of Music and Musicians, 2nd edition, edited by Stanley Sadie. London: Macmillan.  (hardcover).  (eBook). Also at Oxford Music Online (subscription required).
 Bartlet, M. Elizabeth C. (1992). "Opéra-ballet", vol. 3, pp. 683–684, in The New Grove Dictionary of Opera, 4 volumes, edited by Stanley Sadie. New York: Grove. . Also at Oxford Music Online (subscription required).
 Bellingham, Jane (2002). "opéra-ballet", p. 862, in The Oxford Companion to Music, edited by Alison Latham. Oxford: Oxford University Press. . Also at Oxford Music Online (subscription required).
 Pitou, Spire (1983). The Paris Opéra. An Encyclopedia of Operas, Ballets, Composers, and Performers – Genesis and Glory, 1671-1715. Westport, Connecticut: Greenwood Press. .
 Warrack, John; West, Ewan (1992). The Oxford Dictionary of Opera. Oxford: Oxford University Press. .

 Operas-ballet
Opera genres
Opera terminology